Harutaeographa elphinia is a moth of the family Noctuidae. It is found in Indochina and Vietnam (Lao Cai, Tonkin).

References

Moths described in 1999
Orthosiini